Blenker is an unincorporated community in the town of Milladore, in Wood County, Wisconsin, United States.

History
A post office has been in operation at Blenker since 1886. The community was named after John Blenker, a shopkeeper and the first postmaster. The community once had a schoolhouse, the Blenker School.

Images

References

External links
 1909 plat map of Blenker

Unincorporated communities in Wisconsin
Unincorporated communities in Wood County, Wisconsin